Kihnu Islets Nature Reserve is a nature reserve which is located in Pärnu County, Estonia.

The area of the nature reserve is 4200 ha.

The protected area was founded in 1964 as Sange Islets botanical-zoological prohibitation area. In 2014 the protected area was designated to the nature reserve.

References

Nature reserves in Estonia
Geography of Pärnu County